North Malabar Gramin Bank (NMGB) was a Regional Rural Bank in Kerala, India. It was established in 1976 as a Scheduled Commercial Bank as per the Regional Rural Banks Act of 1976 to provide banking facilities in the North Malabar region. It operated in seven districts of Kerala with the headquarters at Kannur, and had 222 branches . The bank distinguished itself as one of the few profit making RRBs in India before its amalgamation.

On 8 July 2013, per a Government of India notification, North Malabar Gramin Bank (sponsored by Syndicate Bank) and South Malabar Gramin Bank (sponsored by Canara Bank) were amalgamated into a single entity as the Kerala Gramin Bank, with its head office at Malappuram, and Canara Bank as the sponsor bank, after consulting NABARD, the concerned sponsor banks and the Government of Kerala.

Board of directors
The bank's board of directors had the following members before its amalgamation into Kerala Gramin Bank

 P. Madhu, Chairman
 Dr Tapan Kumar Pradhan
 V. Asokan
 P. Dinesh

See also

Kerala Gramin Bank
 Kerala Bank
 NMGB HomePage

References

Banks established in 1976
Banks disestablished in 2013
1976 establishments in Kerala
Defunct banks of India
Indian companies established in 1976
Indian companies disestablished in 2013
Banks based in Kerala